Dexia is a genus of tachinid flies in the family Tachinidae. Most larvae are parasitoids of beetles (Scarabaeidae).

Species
Dexia afra Curran, 1927
Dexia alticola Zhang & Shima, 2010
Dexia atripes Meigen, 1838
Dexia aurohumera Emden, 1947
Dexia basifera Walker, 1859
Dexia caldwelli Curran, 1927
Dexia capensis Robineau-Desvoidy, 1830
Dexia chaoi Zhang & Shima, 2010
Dexia chinensis Zhang & Chen, 2010
Dexia concolor Eversmann, 1834
Dexia divergens Walker, 1856
Dexia extendens Walker, 1856
Dexia flavida (Townsend, 1925)
Dexia fulvifera von Röder, 1893
Dexia gilva Mesnil, 1980
Dexia hainanensis Zhang, 2005
Dexia rustica (Fabricius, 1775)
Dexia vacua (Fallén, 1817)
Dexia ventralis Aldrich, 1925

References

Dexiinae
Tachinidae genera
Taxa named by Johann Wilhelm Meigen